Thomas McCrae (December 16, 1870 – June 30, 1935) was Professor of Medicine at Jefferson Medical College, and student and later colleague of Sir William Osler. Often quoted in medical training for his remark "more is missed by not looking than not knowing". He was the brother of John McCrae, author of In Flanders Fields.

Early life and medical training
Thomas McCrae was born in Guelph, Ontario, Canada to Lieutenant-Colonel David McCrae and Janet Simpson Eckford McCrae. 

McCrae trained in medicine at the University of Toronto, obtaining his Doctorate of Medicine in 1903.

He became an assistant resident at Johns Hopkins Hospital in 1895 in Baltimore, Maryland and was later joined by his brother in 1899. It was there that he became associated with Dr William Osler (later Sir William) who was the "pre-eminent medical educator of his time".

McCrae's association with Osler continued with their collaboration in The Principles and Practice of Medicine, an authoritative medical text at the time. McCrae was initially assistant editor, but later became the editor of this text upon Osler's death.

Later career
In 1912 he became Professor of Medicine at Jefferson Medical College in Philadelphia.

"In 1924, he was Lumleian lecturer at the Royal College of Physicians in London. He was chairman of the Section on Practice of Medicine of the American Medical Association, 1914–1915. From 1916 to 1925 he was secretary of the Association of American Physicians and in 1930 its president."

McCrae died in 1935 in Philadelphia with no children to survive him and wife Amy Marian Gwyn (1878–1959). He is described in an obituary in the Canadian Medical Association Journal as a "deep student, a fine clinician, (and) a great teacher". McCrae is buried at Grove Cemetery in Dundas, Ontario.

References

 "Lieutenant Colonel John McCrae" on Veterans' Affairs Canada
 Box 149 and 151 Photograph Albums in The Alan Mason Chesney Medical Archives at The Johns Hopkins Medical Institutions
 "Thomas McCrae Fonds" in the Osler Library Archive Collections

External links
 

1870 births
1935 deaths
Johns Hopkins Hospital physicians
Physicians from Ontario
University of Toronto alumni